The Boone and Scenic Valley Railroad  is a heritage railroad that operates freight and passenger excursions in Boone County, Iowa.

History
The heritage and excursion railroad was begun in 1983 by a group of volunteers who wanted to preserve a scenic section of the former Fort Dodge, Des Moines and Southern Railroad (FDDMS). The original track was built in the 1890s and electrified in 1907. After massive flooding damaged the power plant (located at Fraser, Iowa) providing electricity to the line in 1954, the railroad soon turned to diesel equipment to pull its trains. The Chicago & North Western (CNW) purchased the entire FD|DMS system in 1968. Shortly after acquiring the line, the Chicago & North Western began to place portions of it up for abandonment. In 1983, an  section of the line was purchased by the Boone Railroad Historical Society, and its 2254 charter members, for $50,000. The line runs from Boone, through the old coal mining town of Fraser, and ends at the site of the former junction with the Minneapolis and St. Louis Railway at Wolf.

The railroad, an immediate success, has expanded regularly since its founding. A depot was dedicated in 1985. Today, more than 30,000 visitors take a ride on one of the regular or special event trains, including Thomas the Tank Engine (September), the Pumpkin Express (October), and Santa Express (weekends between Thanksgiving and Christmas) that features a book written and illustrated especially for the trip. Dining cars are reserved for special dinner trains.

The James H. Andrew Railroad Museum and History Center was added to the existing depot and dedicated in 2012. It displays and preserves thousands of Iowa railroad artifacts and memorabilia such as track equipment, toy trains, dining car china, timetables, photos, lanterns, and telegraph equipment. The museum hosts special exhibitions, maintains a research library, and has a small theater/conference room.

Collection
The railroad owns numerous locomotives and dozens of cars.

One of the railroad's steam locomotives, former Crab Orchard and Egyptian Railway (CO&E) 2-8-0 No. 17, is most widely known for holding the historic title as the last operating common carrier steam locomotive in North America. Purchased on February 9, 1987, it sat on display for several years while painted with the CO&E's pyramid logo, but it is also in poor condition, since it has been sitting outdoors. It has been moved, along with a non-operable passenger car, to a location prominently visible from Highway 30 in Boone. The locomotive, its tender, and the passenger car are on permanent static display as a welcome sign for Boone, and the locomotive has been repainted to black.

In the late 1980s, the railroad also acquired one of the last new 2-8-2 Mikado steam locomotives to be constructed in China (China Railways JS No. 8419, cost $335,000). The JS locomotive powers the museum's 1920s excursion trains on Saturdays, from Memorial Day Weekend to October 31.

In 2002 the BSVY acquired and restored an GMD FP9, originally a Via Rail Canada passenger locomotive. Painted in Chicago and North Western Railway inspired colors, it powers the BSVR dinner train.

The railroad also runs a short trolley ride and has begun to do light freight switching at Boone industries in recent years.  Its station is located just one block from the Union Pacific Railroad mainline.

On March 10, 2023, ex-Chicago and North Western 401, an EMD F7, arrived on the railroad, having been donated by the Union Pacific Railroad. The railroad plans to restore the locomotive to operating condition.

Gallery

See also

List of heritage railroads in the United States

References

External links

Official website

Iowa railroads
Heritage railroads in Iowa
Switching and terminal railroads
Spin-offs of the Chicago and North Western Transportation Company
Tourist attractions in Boone County, Iowa
Museums in Boone County, Iowa
Railroad museums in Iowa
Transportation in Boone County, Iowa